TV Mania was a British-American electronic band founded in 1995 that consisted of keyboardist Nick Rhodes and guitarist Warren Cuccurullo (both of Duran Duran), long-time Duran Duran keyboard tech and collaborator Mark Tinley (a.k.a. Mark Ty-Wharton) and producer/multi-instrumentalist Anthony J. Resta.

History
This long-running side project, which Rhodes and Cuccurullo returned to whenever work on various Duran Duran projects slowed down, produced more than 60 songs, but did not see a commercial release at the time, although the Duran Duran album Medazzaland contained some re-worked TV Mania material.  A few songs have appeared on Cuccurullo's website and in the 2004 movie Trollywood, directed by Madeleine Farley.

The project was thought to be largely abandoned since Cuccurullo's dismissal from Duran Duran in 2001.

Production of the Duran Duran albums Medazzaland and Pop Trash by Cuccurullo, Rhodes and Anthony J. Resta was also credited to TV Mania, as well as SYN Productions, the production company founded by LeBon, his wife Yasmin, and Nick Wood. This was a departure from previous albums, where production was always credited to Duran Duran plus any outside producer.

After Rhodes came upon the original TV Mania DAT master tapes in a storage facility, an official release was planned.

In 2013, the long lost TV Mania album, Bored with Prozac and the Internet?, finally saw an official release on vinyl and a limited edition box set. The artwork was created by Nick Rhodes and Andrew Day and features a cover illustration by Vania Zouravliov. It was released through The Vinyl Factory and digitally via The Orchard/Beatport.

Discography

Studio albums
 Bored with Prozac and the Internet? (2013)

References

External links
TV Mania website
TV Mania on Twitter
TV Mania on YouTube
Duran Duran website

English electronic music groups
Musical groups established in 1995
Duran Duran